Sharon Susan Rendle MBE (born 18 June 1966 in Kingston upon Hull, East Riding of Yorkshire) is a retired female judoka from the United Kingdom.

Judo career
Rendle competed in two consecutive Summer Olympics, starting in 1992, when she won the bronze medal in the women's featherweight division (– 52 kg). She was a multiple medal winner at the World Championships including winning Gold at both the 1987 World Judo Championships and the 1989 World Judo Championships, also in the women's featherweight division (–52 kg).

She also won a gold medal in the -52 kg division at the 1988 Summer Olympics in Seoul, where women's judo was held as a demonstration sport. She also represented England and won a gold medal in the 52 kg half-lightweight category, at the 1990 Commonwealth Games in Auckland, New Zealand.

In 1986, she won the gold  medal in the 52 kg weight category at the judo demonstration sport event as part of the 1986 Commonwealth Games. In addition to her international success she was champion of Great Britain on four occasions, winning the featherweight division at the British Judo Championships in 1985, 1986, 1987 and 1991.

References

External links
 
 British Olympic Committee

1966 births
Living people
Sportspeople from Kingston upon Hull
British female judoka
Judoka at the 1988 Summer Olympics
Judoka at the 1992 Summer Olympics
Judoka at the 1996 Summer Olympics
Olympic bronze medallists for Great Britain
Olympic medalists in judo
Members of the Order of the British Empire
Medalists at the 1992 Summer Olympics
Judoka at the 1990 Commonwealth Games
Commonwealth Games medallists in judo
Commonwealth Games gold medallists for England
Medallists at the 1990 Commonwealth Games